Chen Zhi (died 23 September 259), courtesy name Fengzong, was an official of the state of Shu Han during the Three Kingdoms period of China. Though highly talented and considered a promising youth by his peers, Chen Zhi later revealed himself to be a corrupt individual. He had a major role in the decline of Shu's court and Huang Hao's rise at Liu Shan side.

Life
Chen Zhi was from Runan Commandery, which covered parts of present-day southern Henan and northwestern Anhui. He was a maternal grandson of an elder brother of Xu Jing, who briefly served as Minister over the Masses of the state of Shu during the early Three Kingdoms period. As he was orphaned at a young age, he was raised by his granduncle Xu Jing.

Chen Zhi had quite a reputation in Shu by the time he was about 19 years old. He started his career as a low-level official in the selection bureau of the imperial secretariat of Shu. He was known for having a stern and dignified demeanour. As he was well-versed in a variety of arts and crafts, he impressed Fei Yi, the head of the Shu government between 246 and 253. Following Dong Yun's death in 246, Fei Yi recommended Chen Zhi to replace Dong Yun as a Palace Attendant.

Chen Zhi quickly earned the favour of the Shu emperor Liu Shan, and formed an alliance with the eunuch Huang Hao to dominate the political scene together. Huang Hao gained power for the first time in his life after Dong Yun's death because Dong Yun distrusted Huang Hao and actively kept him out of politics while he was still alive. Ever since Chen Zhi became one of his most favoured officials, Liu Shan gradually began to resent Dong Yun and see him as "arrogant and disrespectful". Chen Zhi and Huang Hao also often spoke ill of Dong Yun in front of Liu Shan and make the emperor hate Dong Yun even more.

When Lü Yi, the Prefect of the Masters of Writing, died in 251, Liu Shan ordered Chen Zhi to replace him. In addition to his appointment as Prefect of the Masters of Writing, Chen Zhi concurrently held the positions of Palace Attendant and General Who Guards the Army. Although Chen Zhi ranked lower than General-in-Chief Jiang Wei in the military hierarchy, he had greater influence in politics because he was in the emperor's favour and had Huang Hao's support. Besides, Jiang Wei was also away on military campaigns against Shu's rival state Wei most of the time so he did not regularly attend imperial court sessions.

Chen Zhi died on 23 September 259. Liu Shan shed tears and deeply lamented his death, and issued an imperial decree to honour him with the posthumous title "Marquis Zhong" (忠侯; "loyal marquis"). 

After Chen Zhi's death, Huang Hao continued to rise through the ranks and gain greater power while showing favouritism towards his supporters and those who fawned on him. The Shu government also became more corrupt under Huang Hao's influence until its eventual collapse in 263.

Family
Liu Shan enfeoffed Chen Zhi's first son, Chen Can, as a Secondary Marquis, and appointed his second son, Chen Yu, as a Gentleman of the Yellow Gate.

See also
 Lists of people of the Three Kingdoms

References

 Chen, Shou (3rd century). Records of the Three Kingdoms (Sanguozhi).
 Pei, Songzhi (5th century). Annotations to Records of the Three Kingdoms (Sanguozhi zhu).
 

Year of birth unknown
258 deaths
Shu Han politicians
Shu Han generals
Politicians from Henan
Political office-holders in Sichuan